Live in New Orleans may refer to:

311 Day: Live in New Orleans DVD
Live in New Orleans (Maze album)
Live in New Orleans (Norah Jones video album)
Live in New Orleans, CD by Spencer Bohren 2007
Live in New Orleans, CD by Liza Minnelli 2011 
Live In New Orleans, Liza Minnelli video album 2011
Live in New Orleans, by Neville Brothers